Dream of a Cossack (translit. Kavalier zolotoy zvezdy)  is a 1951 Soviet drama film directed by Yuli Raizman based on the novel The Golden Star Chavalier by Semyon Babayevsky. It was entered into the 1951 Cannes Film Festival.

Plot
Sergei Tutarinov, a veteran of the Great Patriotic War, returns to his native village to take an active part in its restoration. His initiatives are strongly supported by the local Secretary of the Communist Party. Tutarinov becomes chairman of the party and begins to rebuild the whole town after the defeat of the Germans.

Cast
 Sergei Bondarchuk as Semyon Tutarinov
 Anatoli Chemodurov as Semyon Goncharenko
 Kira Kanayeva as Irina Lyubasheva
 Boris Chirkov as Kondratyev
 Pyotr Komissarov as Khokhlakov
 Vladimir Ratomsky as Ragulin
 N. Sevelov as Ostroukhov
 Nikolai Gritsenko as Artamashov
 Ivan Pereverzev as Boichenko
 F. Kiryutin as Nenashev
 Tamara Nosova as Anfisa
 Stepan Kayukov as Rubstov-Yennitsky
 Aleksandr Antonov
 Semyon Svashenko as Secretary
 N. Svetlov as Ostroukhov

References

External links

1951 films
1951 drama films
Soviet drama films
1950s Russian-language films
Films directed by Yuli Raizman
Crystal Globe winners